The Former Church of St. Mary is a former Roman Catholic parish church. Located at 202 East 69th Street in Manhattan, New York City, the parish was established in 1895; the Roman Catholic Archdiocese of New York closed it in 1999.

References 

Religious organizations established in 1895
Religious organizations disestablished in 1999
Closed churches in the Roman Catholic Archdiocese of New York
Closed churches in New York City
Roman Catholic churches in Manhattan
Upper East Side
1895 establishments in New York City
1999 disestablishments in New York (state)